Bruno Risi (born 6 September 1968) is a retired Swiss professional racing cyclist. He competed at five Olympic Games.

Risi was one of the top six-day riders of his generation, he won many professional Madison events during his long career.

He is the ninth Swiss sportsperson to compete at five Olympics (1988, 1996/2008), after middle-distance runner Paul Martin, equestrians Henri Chammartin and Gustav Fischer, javelin thrower Urs von Wartburg, equestrian Christine Stückelberger, and Alpine skier Paul Accola, shooter Gabriele Bühlmann, and equestrian Markus Fuchs.

Palmares

1990
 1st, Stage 5a, Circuit Franco-Belge, Wasquehal
  World Amateur Points Race Championship
1991
  World Amateur Points Race Champion
 1st, Giro del Lago Maggiore -GP Knorr-
 1st, Tour du Lac Léman
1992
  World Points Race Champion
 1st, Six-Days of Dortmund (with Kurt Betschart)
 2nd, Overall, Niederösterreich Rundfahrt
1993
 1st, Six Days' of Dortmund, Ghent & München (with Kurt Betschart)
 2nd, National Team Pursuit Championship (with Betschart/Büchler/Gisler)
1994
  World Points Race Champion
 1st, Six-Days' of København & München (with Kurt Betschart)
 2nd, Omloop Wase Scheldeboorden
1995
  European Madison Champion (with Kurt Betschart)
 1st, Six-Days' of Bremen & Köln (with Kurt Betschart)
  World Madison Championship (with Kurt Betschart)
1996
 1st, Six-Days' of Ghent & København (with Kurt Betschart)
  European Madison Championship (with Kurt Betschart)
 2nd, National Team Pursuit Championship (with Betschart/Gisler/Strüby)
1997
 1st, Six-Days' of Dortmund, Leipzig & München (with Kurt Betschart)
  World Points Race Championship
  European Madison Championship (with Kurt Betschart)
1998
 1st, Six-Days' of München, Stuttgart & Herning (with Kurt Betschart)
 1st, Six-Days of Fiorenzuola d'Arda (with Giovanni Lombardi)
1999
  World Points Race Champion
 1st, Six-Days' of Bremen & Dortmund (with Kurt Betschart)
2000
  Points Race Champion
 1st, Six-Days of München (with Kurt Betschart)
 1st, Elgger Radomnium
 1st, Schorndorf
  European Madison Championship (with Kurt Betschart)
2001
  World Points Race Champion
 1st, Weil-am-Rhein & Osnabrück
 1st, Osnabrück, Derny
  European Madison Championship (with Kurt Betschart)
2002
 1st, Six-Days' of Bremen, Ghent & Stuttgart (with Kurt Betschart)
 1st, Weil-am-Rhein, Osnabrück & Sindelfingen – Schleife
  European Madison Championship (with Kurt Betschart)
2003
  World Madison Champion (with Franco Marvulli)
  Scratch Champion
 1st, Six-Days' of Berlin, Dortmund & München (with Kurt Betschart)
 1st, Bruckmühl, Schaffhausen & Wangen
 1st, Holzkirchen (with Thomas Höß)
 2nd, National Elimination Championship
  European Madison Championship (with Kurt Betschart)
2004
 1st, Six-Days of Bremen (with Kurt Betschart)
 1st, Ruggell, Bottrop-Kirchhellen, Dachau & Steinhagen
  Olympic Games, Madison (with Franco Marvulli)
  World Madison Championship (with Franco Marvulli)
2005
 1st, Six-Days of Stuttgart (with Kurt Betschart & Franco Marvulli)
 1st, Six-Days' of Berlin & Amsterdam (with Kurt Betschart)
 1st, Trois Jours d'Aigle (with Maxime Bally)
 1st, Geldern
2006
  European Madison Champion (with Franco Marvulli)
  Madison Champion (with Franco Marvulli)
 1st, Six-Days' of Dortmund & München (with Erik Zabel)
 1st, Six Days of Maastricht (with Franco Marvulli)
2007
  World Madison Champion (with Franco Marvulli)
  Madison Champion (with Franco Marvulli)
 1st, Six-Days of Stuttgart (with Franco Marvulli & Erik Zabel)
 1st, Six-Days' of Zurich, København, Hasselt, Dortmund, Fiorenzuola d'Arda, München & Zuidlaren (with Marvulli)
 1st, Six-Days of Bremen (with Alexander Äschbach)
 1st, Gelsenkirchen, Bruckmühl & Hasle-Ruegsau
 1st, Stage 1, Rheinberg
 1st, Stage 2, Emmerich
 1st, Stage 3, Schermbeck
2008
 1st, Six-Days' of Zurich, Berlin, København & Hasselt (with Franco Marvulli)

See also
List of athletes with the most appearances at Olympic Games

References

External links

1968 births
Living people
People from the canton of Uri
Swiss male cyclists
Cyclists at the 1988 Summer Olympics
Cyclists at the 1996 Summer Olympics
Cyclists at the 2000 Summer Olympics
Cyclists at the 2004 Summer Olympics
Cyclists at the 2008 Summer Olympics
Olympic cyclists of Switzerland
Olympic silver medalists for Switzerland
Olympic medalists in cycling
Medalists at the 2004 Summer Olympics
UCI Track Cycling World Champions (men)
Swiss track cyclists